Val-de-Vesle is a commune in the Marne department in the Grand Est region in north-eastern France.

History
The Val-de-Vesle commune was created in 1965 with the merger of the former communes of Courmelois, Thuisy and Wez.

See also
Communes of the Marne department

References

Valdevesle